Hugh Everard Wedgwood, 3rd Baron Wedgwood (20 April 1921 – 25 April 1970) was the third Baron Wedgwood of the pottery dynasty.

Biography 
He was the son and only child of The Hon. Francis Wedgwood (later 2nd Baron) and his wife Edith May Telfer, daughter of William Telfer of Glasgow. He was the great-great-great-great-grandson of the potter Josiah Wedgwood. Like his father, he was educated at Bedales School. During the Second World War he served as an officer in the Kenya Regiment. In 1949 he married Jane Weymouth Poulton, daughter of W.J. Poulton of Kenjockety, Molo, Kenya; they had one son, Piers and two daughters. He was a farmer in Hillwood, Molo, Kenya, 1941–1964. Upon his father's death in 1959 he succeeded his father as the 3rd Baron Wedgwood. Upon his own death in 1970, the Barony passed to his son Piers.

References 

'WEDGWOOD', Who Was Who, A & C Black, 1920–2008; online edn, Oxford University Press, Dec 2007 accessed 26 Dec 2010

Wedgwood, Hugh Everard, 3rd Baron
Wedgwood, Hugh Everard, 3rd Baron
People educated at Bedales School
Kenya Regiment officers
Wedgwood, Hugh Everard, 3rd Baron
Wedgwood, Hugh Everard, 3rd Baron
British expatriates in Kenya